Clarence 'Clarrie' Horder (1890–1960) was an Australian pioneer rugby league player who played in the 1910s and 1920s.

Background
Horder was born in Sydney, New South Wales, Australia to parents Charles and Ellen Horder on 27 August 1890.

Playing career
The older brother of South Sydney and North Sydney legend Harold Horder, Horder was also a handy rugby league player for South Sydney, playing eight seasons with them between 1913-1921. Known by the nickname of 'Spot', Horder also played representative rugby league for New South Wales in 1919 and for Queensland in 1922. 

Horder scored 41 tries and 14 goals (total 151 points) for South Sydney during his career. In 1922 he became captain-coach of an Ipswich team before retiring from the game and returning to Sydney.

Death
Horder died on 6 June 1960 at St. George Hospital, aged 69. He was cremated at Woronora Crematorium, Sutherland.

References

1890 births
1960 deaths
Australian rugby league players
New South Wales rugby league team players
Queensland rugby league team players
Rugby league centres
Rugby league players from Sydney
Rugby league wingers
South Sydney Rabbitohs players
South Sydney Rabbitohs captains